Scott Wright   (born 8 August 1997) is a Scottish professional footballer who plays as a winger for Scottish Premiership club Rangers.

Wright began his career at Aberdeen, where he made his competitive debut at the age of 16 in July 2014. He made 80 appearances over seven seasons for Aberdeen, and had a loan spell at Dundee in 2019. Wright was signed by Rangers in February 2021.

Wright made 29 appearances for Scotland at youth international level. He represented the under-17, under-19, under-20 and under-21 teams.

Club career

Aberdeen
Wright was raised in the village of Balmedie in Aberdeenshire, where he was a neighbour of fellow footballer Cammy Smith, and attended Bridge of Don Academy. A product of Aberdeen's youth system, he made his first-team debut for the club aged 16 in a UEFA Europa League qualifying match against Daugava Riga in July 2014. Soon afterwards, he signed a three-year contract with Aberdeen. Wright scored a hat-trick in a 6–0 Scottish Premiership win against Partick Thistle on 21 May 2017.

Wright was loaned to Dundee on 31 January 2019, until the end of the 2018–19 season. Dundee were relegated at the end of the season.

After making his return to Aberdeen the following season, Wright featured for the club several times in the UEFA Europa League qualifying round, as well as in the first few league matches. However, in September 2019, he suffered a cruciate ligament injury in training and was forced to miss out on the rest of the season.

Rangers
Wright signed a pre-contract agreement with Rangers in January 2021, with the move to the Glasgow side to be completed during the summer of 2021. Aberdeen agreed to sell him to Rangers on 1 February for £175,000, with Ross McCrorie's scheduled move in the opposite direction also brought forward. Wright made his debut for the club a week later in a Scottish Premiership match against Hamilton Academical on 7 February. He scored his first goal for the club on 21 April 2021, in a 1–1 draw with St Johnstone. Wright scored Rangers' second goal in their 2–0 victory over Hearts in the 2022 Scottish Cup Final.

International career
Wright played youth international football for Scotland from 2014 to 2018 at under-17, under-19, under-20 and under-21 levels.

He represented the Scotland under-17 team at the UEFA European Under-17 Championship in Malta in 2014. The team were beaten by the Netherlands at the semi-final stage.

Wright was selected in the Scotland under-20 squad for the 2017 Toulon Tournament. The team secured the bronze medal, the nations first ever medal at the competition. He played for the under-21 team at the 2018 Toulon Tournament. Scotland lost to Turkey in a penalty shoot-out and finished fourth.

Career statistics

Honours
Aberdeen U20
 SPFL Development League: 2014–15

Aberdeen
Scottish Cup runner-up: 2016–17
Scottish League Cup runner-up: 2018–19

Rangers
Scottish Premiership: 2020–21
Scottish Cup: 2021–22
 UEFA Europa League runner-up: 2021–22

Scotland U21
 Toulon Tournament bronze medal: 2017

References

External links
Profile at the Rangers F.C. website

1997 births
Living people
People from Formartine
People educated at Bridge of Don Academy
Scottish footballers
Footballers from Aberdeenshire
Association football forwards
Scotland under-21 international footballers
Scotland youth international footballers
Scottish Professional Football League players
Aberdeen F.C. players
Dundee F.C. players
Rangers F.C. players